Charfield railway station served the village of Charfield in South Gloucestershire, England. The station was on the Bristol and Gloucester Railway, originally a broad gauge line overseen by Isambard Kingdom Brunel, but later taken over by the Midland Railway and converted to standard gauge.

History
Charfield station opened with the Bristol and Gloucester line in 1844 and had substantial Brunel-designed buildings on both platforms. There were sidings to the north and south, and those to the north were converted to loops to allow slow trains to be overtaken by faster trains.

In 1928, the Charfield railway disaster occurred when a southbound night-time mail train overran signals into a goods train manoeuvring into these sidings, and in the collision the mail train was diverted into the path of a northbound freight train. Gas from the mail train ignited and 15 people died in the blaze. According to some accounts, among them were two children whose identity was never established.

Passenger services were withdrawn from Charfield in January 1965 with the removal of stopping services on the Bristol to Gloucester line. Goods services were withdrawn in September of the same year. The main station building and the station master's house remain, in residential use.

Proposed reopening 
Services between Bristol and Birmingham pass through Charfield. There have been discussions about the viability of reopening the station. The costs would be shared between Gloucestershire and South Gloucestershire councils since, although the station would be in South Gloucestershire, the nearby town of Wotton-under-Edge would be a principal beneficiary.

In February 2019, the West of England Combined Authority announced a £500,000 feasibility study into plans for two new bypasses and work to see whether Charfield is viable for reopening to passengers. In June 2019, a further £900,000 was allocated for the production of a full business case for the reopening of the station.

The January 2020 version of the Joint Local Transport Plan 4 (JLTP4, led by the West of England Combined Authority) proposed to deliver by 2023–2024 a "New station at Charfield funded through the WECA Investment Fund, to support housing growth".

In June 2020, Councillor Toby Savage, leader of South Gloucestershire Council, mentioned the possibility of re-opening Charfield station during an announcement of plans for enhanced services between Bristol and Gloucester.

A plan agreed by the West of England Combined Authority on 8 December 2020 set out projects that could potentially be delivered between 2020 and 2030, including the reopening of Charfield station 

A 12-week public consultation on the re-opening proposals was held between 19 October 2021 and 10 January 2022, with the new station proposed to open at the end of 2024

Services

References

Former Midland Railway stations
Disused railway stations in Bristol, Bath and South Gloucestershire
Railway stations in Great Britain opened in 1844
Railway stations in Great Britain closed in 1965
Beeching closures in England
Proposed railway stations in England